Pakistan Corona Relief Tiger Force  is a newly development volunteer task force to provide health facilities affected area of the Pakistan. According to Pakistan's prime minister Mr Imran khan we created this volunteer health force because of our institutions' lack of staff, whereas Pakistan population is more than 60% youth so they will help us. Task force started its work from Islamabad but later Corona increased in Pakistan other cities so task force role enhanced as well,  The volunteers have helped district administrations implement coronavirus standard operating procedures like social distancing in mosques and public places, distributed food and other essentials among the poor and ensured that ‘smart lockdowns’ in coronavirus hotspots were followed. Task force is governed by Muhammad Usman Dar.

References

Volunteering in Pakistan
Volunteer organisations in Pakistan